Mackay Glacier is a large glacier in Victoria Land, descending eastward from the Antarctic polar plateau, between the Convoy Range and Clare Range, into the southern part of Granite Harbour. It was discovered by the South Magnetic Pole party of the British Antarctic Expedition, 1907–09, and named for Alistair F. Mackay, a member of the party. The glacier's tongue is called Mackay Glacier Tongue. First mapped by the British Antarctic Expedition (1910–13) and named in association with Mackay Glacier.

Cuff Cape emerges from the icy coast immediately south of Mackay Glacier.

References

Glaciers of Victoria Land
Scott Coast